GAG: The Impotent Mystery (ГЭГ: Отвязное приключение 1997) and its add-on GAG + Harry on Vacation (ГЭГ+ Гарри в отпуске 1999), sequel GAG 2: Back in the Future (ГЭГ 2: Назад в будущее  2002), and spin-off The Adventures of Harry: The evidence Under the Underwear  (Приключения Гарри: Улики под нижним бельём) are a series of four Russian adventure games. 

They are parodies and erotic-themed games emulating the Leisure Suit Larry series.

The player takes the role of Gary Tusker, a secret service agent who specialises in preventing sexual and religious perversion. GAG: The Impotent Mystery is a 1st person, point-and-click and inventory-based adventure game. It is often considered the first Russian game in the quest genre. Absolute Games assessed the sequel as "exceptionally funny", "interesting" and intellectual.

References

External links
 Mobygames

1997 video games
Adventure games
Erotic video games
Parody video games
Spy video games
Video games developed in Russia
Windows games
Works about vacationing